Makhosini Henry Xaba (born 12 June 1974), better known by stage name Joe Nina, is a popular South African singer. In 1997 he wrote the theme song for, and joined the cast, of Les Blair's Channel Four Films improv comedy film Jump the Gun.

Discography
His first albums in the early 1990s under the aliases T McCool and King Rap, before switching to Joe Nina:
One Time One Vibe - first album as Joe Nina
Ding Dong (1994) - featuring hit single "Ding Dong"
Joy - Kuya Sheshwa La (1996) - featuring hit single "Joy"
Egogogweni (1998)
Sbali (1999)
Mbabasa (2000)
Nomthandazo (2001)
Moments (2005) - featuring hit "Ebunzimeni"
Unchained (2009)
Back Together 4 Life (2014)'
Ding Dong — The Greatest Hits At 40

Singles
Hit singles include:
"Ding Dong" 
"Precisely"
 "S'Bali"
"Zodwa"
 "Pascalina" 
"Maria Podesta" 
"Phuma Kimi".

References

South African musicians
Living people
1974 births